Parampan thali Sree Mahadeva  Temple is located at Mullassery, Thrissur district of Kerala state, India. It is 5 kilometres (3.1 miles) from National Highway 17, and 20 kilometres from Thrissur city on the way to Guruvayur via Kanjany.

References

External links
 Parampanthali - Siva Temple

Shiva temples in Kerala
Hindu temples in Thrissur district
108 Shiva Temples